All competitive handball in Scotland is sanctioned and organised by the Scottish Handball Association.

Points system
For this season a new points system has been adopted for both the men's and women's leagues:

3 Points for a Win
2 Points for a Draw
1 Point for a Defeat by 10 goals or less
0 Points for a Defeat greater than 11 goals

Venues
Blackburn Community Centre, West Lothian Directions

Will host Men's and the Scottish Cup

Ravnescraig Leisure Centre, Motherwell Directions

Will host Men's League Games and the Scottish Cup Finals

Tryst Sports Centre, Cumbernauld

Will host two rounds of the Men's League

Scottish Handball Men's League 2011/12
This season five teams will compete for the League Title:

 Dundee Handball Club
 Edinburgh Handball Club
 EK82 Handball Club
 Glasgow Handball Club
 Tryst 77 Handball Club

Men's League fixtures

Week One
08/10/2011 @ Blackburn

 Dundee HC lost by 10 Goals, 1 bonus point awarded.

Week Two
15/10/2011 @ Blackburn

Week Three
29/10/2011 @ Blackburn

 EK82 HC & Edinburgh HC lost by less than 10 Goals, 1 bonus point awarded.

Week Four
13/11/2011 @ Ravenscraig

 Dundee HC & Edinburgh HC lost by less than 10 Goals, 1 bonus point awarded.

Week Five
26/11/2011 @ Blackburn

 Dundee HC & EK82 HC lost by less than 10 Goals, 1 bonus point awarded.

Week Six
03/12/2011 @ Blackburn

 Edinburgh HC lost by less than 10 Goals, 1 bonus point awarded.

Week Seven
10/12/2011 @ Blackburn &
17/12/2011 @ Tryst

 Glasgow HC lost by less than 10 Goals, 1 bonus point awarded.

Week Eight
28/01/2012 @ Blackburn

Glasgow HC & Dundee HC lost by less than 10 Goals, 1 bonus point awarded.

Week Nine
04/02/2012 @ Blackburn

Week Ten
26/02/2012 @ Blackburn

Edinburgh HC & EK82 HC lost by less than 10 Goals, 1 bonus point awarded.

Week Eleven
03/03/2012 @ Blackburn

Week Twelve
17/03/2012 @ Blackburn

Week Thirteen
31/03/2012 @ Blackburn

Week Fourteen
14/04/2012 @ Blackburn

Week Fifteen
22/04/2012 @ Tryst

Men's League table 2011/12

Men's League statistics
The following statistics for the Scottish Handball League are up to and including week 10:

Top goalscorers

Scottish Cup
Fixtures will be posted when the draw has been made

1st Round
05/05/2012 @ tbc

Semi-finals
19/05/2012 @ Ravenscraig

Final
26/05/2012 @ Ravenscraig

External links
 Official site

Handball competitions in Scotland
Hand
Hand